Daniel Nestor and Sandon Stolle were the defending champions but only Stolle competed that year with Joshua Eagle.

Eagle and Stolle lost in the final 6–4, 6–4 against Donald Johnson and Jared Palmer.

Seeds
Champion seeds are indicated in bold text while text in italics indicates the round in which those seeds were eliminated.

 Donald Johnson /  Jared Palmer (champions)
 Joshua Eagle /  Sandon Stolle (final)
 Mike Bryan /  David Rikl (semifinals)
 Petr Pála /  Pavel Vízner (first round)

Draw

External links
 Main Draw

2002 Adidas International
2002 ATP Tour